Poggio Sommorto is a mountain of Marche, Italy.

Mountains of Marche
Mountains of the Apennines